A hearse is a type of funerary vehicle.

Hearse may also refer to:

Liturgics
A type of candelabrum used during tenebrae services

Movies
 The Hearse, a 1980 horror film

Music
 Hearse (band), a Swedish melodic death metal band
 "Hearse", a 2002 eponymous single by Hearse
 "Hearse", a 2006 eponymous song by Swedish band Hearse off the album In These Veins
 "Hearse", a 1988 song from the album Martha Splatterhead's Maddest Stories Ever Told by the U.S. thrash band The Accüsed
 Hearses, a 2014 video by Smoke DZA
 "The Hearse Song", a WWI-era popular children's song about death

See also
 Ambulance
 Flower car
 First call vehicle
 Commercial vehicle
 Combination car (hearse)